WBHX (99.7 FM, "The Boss") is a radio station licensed to Tuckerton, New Jersey and airs a classic rock format, simulcasting WWZY 107.1 FM Long Branch.

History
On August 10, 1999 WBHX signed on full-time airing a mostly automated classic rock format with "Radio Rohn" in mornings and afternoons hosted by Mike Jarmus, including his Woodstock lunch show featuring music from the Woodstock period.  Specialty shows included "The Dead At Midnight", "Blues Delux" and "The Dr. Demento Show". WBHX was constructed by Beach Haven Communications.

On July 22, 2002, WBHX was Sold to Press for $2.75 Million. On October 2, 2002, "Radio Rohn" Did his Last Morning Show, on October 4, 2002, the station switched to an adult contemporary format known as "The Breeze". The final song played by Radio Rohn before the switch from classic rock to adult contemporary was "Another One Bites the Dust" by Queen, the final song played at midnight was "Nights in White Satin" by the Moody Blues.

Also, Press Began Stunting with Songs Featuring "BREEZE" Or "WIND" Themes, Along With With Sound Effects In Between The Songs.

WWZY simulcast
"107.1 FM" was simulcast to Southern Ocean County New Jersey on 99.7 WBHX in Tuckerton, New Jersey from June 30, 2003 to November 1, 2015. The WBHX transmitter is located on Long Beach Island in the town of Beach Haven, New Jersey. The station is also played throughout most of the day in southern Ocean County on WCAT-TV, the public-access television cable TV channel serving Pinelands Regional High School.

99.7 The Island
Starting November 1, 2015, WBHX began playing Christmas music as "99.7 The Island." On December 26, 2015 WBHX changed their format to classic hits, still under the "99.7 The Island" branding.

WWZY simulcast
On March 3, 2017 WBHX changed their format from classic hits to a simulcast again of classic rock-formatted WWZY 107.1 FM Long Branch, branded as "The Boss".

Attempted move to 99.3
Beginning in 2010, Press Communications attempted to move WBHX inland and to 99.3 MHz. The intent was to force WZBZ, broadcasting on 99.3 from Atlantic City, to move to 99.7 in return. However, stations that are 10.6 or 10.8 MHz apart (near the typical 10.7 MHz intermediate frequency of FM receivers) must be physically separated by 10 km to avoid causing interference in nearby radios. WZBZ's transmitter site is 2 km from that of WAJM (88.9 FM), and moving to 99.7 would separate the two stations by 10.8 MHz. Press' contention was that the frequency swap was possible, since WAJM's license expired in 2006 and it was legally nonexistent – and it did not file for renewal until after WBHX's application, four years later. The FCC's assertion was that precedent favored WAJM, as a proposed facility could not take precedence over an operating station, even if such operation was unlawful. Unusually, Press appealed the FCC's decision to the U.S. Court of Appeals for the D.C. Circuit, who upheld the decision, and later the Supreme Court of the United States, who declined to hear the case.

References

External links

Tuckerton, New Jersey
BHX
Radio stations established in 1999
1999 establishments in New Jersey
Classic rock radio stations in the United States